Hamilton Maxwell West Santana (born 16 October 1977) is a retired Nicaraguan footballer.

Club career
West started his career at Masachapa and moved abroad to join El Salvadorans ADET on loan in 1998 and then moved to Costa Rican side AD Guanacasteca in summer 1999 to play alongside compatriot Danny Téllez. After a season with Real Estelí, where he scored 5 goals in a league match against Chinandega, he returned to Costa Rica to play for Osa. In 2003, he signed with Parmalat. In January 2009, West's goal secured second division side Chinandega promotion to the top tier.

International career
West made his debut for Nicaragua in an April 1997 UNCAF Nations Cup match against Costa Rica and has earned a total of 21 caps, scoring no goals. He has represented his country in 4 FIFA World Cup qualification matches and played at the 1997, 1999, 2001, 2003, 2007 UNCAF Nations Cups.

His final international was a February 2007 UNCAF Nations Cup match against Honduras.

References

External links
 

1977 births
Living people
Sportspeople from Managua
Association football wingers
Nicaraguan men's footballers
Nicaragua international footballers
Real Estelí F.C. players
Chinandega FC players
Nicaraguan expatriate footballers
Expatriate footballers in El Salvador
Expatriate footballers in Costa Rica
Nicaraguan expatriate sportspeople in El Salvador
Nicaraguan expatriate sportspeople in Costa Rica
2001 UNCAF Nations Cup players
2003 UNCAF Nations Cup players
2007 UNCAF Nations Cup players